The 389th Fighter Squadron is part of the 366th Fighter Wing at Mountain Home Air Force Base, Idaho.  It operates McDonnell Douglas F-15E Strike Eagle aircraft conducting close air support.

Mission
Perform close air support, interdiction, strategic attack, suppression of enemy air defense, and defensive counterair missions, employing the full array of U.S. Air Force capabilities including precision-guided munitions, inertially-aided munitions, night vision goggles, fighter data link 366 OG Fact Sheet

History

World War II

The 389th flew combat in the European Theater of Operations from 14 March 1943 to 3 May 1945.

Lt. Col. John B. England, who was commander of the 389th Fighter-Bomber Squadron from Alexandria AFB, was killed when his F-86 crashed into the woods near Toul. He was returning from gunnery practice near Tripoli, Libya. The fog was very thick and visibility was near zero.  After several attempts to locate the runway his plane suffered fuel starvation. At this moment he sighted a portion of the runway and was in a glide with a high probability of a successful landing.  But his glide path took him over the barracks where his men were housed.  He calmly stated on the radio that this was not an acceptable risk.  He turned and crashed into a wooded area outside the base perimeter. In his honor, Alexandria AFB was renamed England Air Force Base, and retained that name until its closure in 1993.

Tactical Air Command

Vietnam War

The squadron flew combat operations in Southeast Asia from 14 March 1966 to 8 October 1971.

Recent operations
The squadron trained F-111 Aardvark aircrews from 30 September 1979 to 26 June 1991.  It rotated aircraft and personnel to Southwest Asia throughout the 1990s in support of Operation Southern Watch.  It furnished resources for units participating in Operation Enduring Freedom and Operation Noble Eagle following the 11 September 2001 terrorist attacks on the United States.  Pilots and aircraft deployed from unit conducted close air support mission after 2005, although the unit itself remained in the United States.

Lineage
 Constituted as the 389th Fighter Squadron (Single-Engine) on 24 May 1943
 Activated on 1 June 1943
 Redesignated 389th Fighter Squadron, Single-Engine on 20 August 1943
 Inactivated on 20 August 1946
 Redesignated 389th Fighter-Bomber Squadron on 15 August 1952
 Activated on 1 January 1953
 Redesignated 389th Tactical Fighter Squadron 1 July 1958
 Inactivated on 1 April 1959
 Activated on 30 April 1962 (not organized)
 Organized on 8 May 1962
 Redesignated 389th Tactical Fighter Training Squadron on 30 September 1979
 Inactivated on 22 July 1991
 Redesignated 389th Fighter Squadron''' on 1 March 1992
 Activated on 11 March 1992

Assignments
 366th Fighter Group, 1 June 1943 – 20 August 1946
 366th Fighter-Bomber Group, 1 January 1953 (attached to Twelfth Air Force 29 September–17 November 1954, 48th Fighter-Bomber Wing 18 November 1954 – 28 March 1955, United States Air Forces in Europe c. 20 September-c. 3 October 1956, 21st Fighter-Bomber Wing after 10 June 1957)
 366th Fighter-Bomber Wing (later 366th Tactical Fighter Wing), 25 September 1957 – 1 April 1959 (remained attached to 21 Fighter-Bomber Wing to c. Oct 1957, attached to 388th Fighter-Bomber Wing, c. Oct-9 Dec 1957, 49th Fighter-Bomber Wing 10–22 December 1957)
 United States Air Forces in Europe, 30 April 1962 (not organized)
 366th Tactical Fighter Wing, 8 May 1962 (attached to Alaskan Air Command, 15 September–16 December 1965)
 37th Tactical Fighter Wing, 15 June 1969
 12th Tactical Fighter Wing, 31 March 1970
 347th Tactical Fighter Wing, 15 October 1971
 366th Tactical Fighter Wing, 31 October 1972 – 22 July 1991
 366th Operations Group, 11 March 1992 – present

Stations

 Richmond Army Air Base, Virginia, VA 1 June 1943
 Bluethenthal Field, North Carolina, 9 August 1943
 Richmond Army Air Base, Virginia, Virginia, 6 November–17 December 1943
 RAF Membury (Station 466), England, 12 January 1944
 RAF Thruxton (Station 407), England, 29 February 1944
 Saint-Pierre-du-Mont Airfield (A-1), France, 17 Jun 194[4]
 Dreux/Vernouillet Airfield (B-52), France, 24 August 1944
 Laon/Couvron Airfield (A-70), France, 12 September 1944
 Asch Airfield (Assche) (Y-29), Belgium, 20 November 1944
 Münster-Handorf Airfield (Y-94), Germany, 14 April 1945
 Bayreuth-Bindlach Airfield (R-26), Germany, 28 June 1945
 Fritzlar Airfield (later AAF Station Fritzlar), Germany (Y-86), 11 September 1945 – 20 Aug ust1946

 Alexandria Air Force Base (later England Air Force Base), Louisiana, 1 January 1953 – 1 April 1959
 Deployed to: 
 Toul-Rosières Air Base, France, 29 September–10 December 1954
 Chaumont Air Base, France (11 December 1954 – 28 March 1955)
 Aviano Air Base, Italy, 21 September–2 October 1956, 10 June–22 December 1957
 Chaumont Air Base, France, 8 May 1962
 Holloman Air Force Base, New Mexico, 12 July 1963 – 11 March 1966 (deployed to Elmendorf Air Force Base, Alaska 15 September–16 December 1965)
 Phan Rang Air Base, South Vietnam, 14 March 1966
 Da Nang Air Base, South Vietnam, 10 October 1966
 Phù Cát Air Base, South Vietnam, 25 June 1969 – 15 October 1971
 Mountain Home Air Force Base, Idaho, 15 October 1971 – 22 July 1991
 Deployed to Taegu Air Base, South Korea, 16 September–5 October 1976
 Mountain Home Air Force Base, Idaho, 11 March 1992 – present

Aircraft

 Republic P-47 Thunderbolt (1943–1946)
 North American P-51 Mustang (1953)
 North American F-86 Sabre (1953–1955)
 Republic F-84 Thunderjet (1955–1958, 1962–1965)
 North American F-100 Super Sabre (1958, 1963)
 McDonnell F-4 Phantom II (1965–1971)
 General Dynamics F-111 AardvarkF then A model (1971–1991)
 General Dynamics F-16 Fighting Falcon (1992–2007)
 McDonnell Douglas F-15E Strike Eagle (2007–present)

References

Notes

Citations

Bibliography

External links
366th Operations Group Fact Sheet

389
Military units and formations established in 1943
Military units and formations in Idaho
Fighter squadrons of the United States Army Air Forces